The Christhunt is an album released in 1992 by Dutch death metal band God Dethroned.

The style on this album is a relatively pure death metal sound with Satanic lyrics, though more melodic black metal sections foreshadowing future releases can be heard in multiple songs such as "Christ Carnage" and "The Christhunt". By the release of this album, the band had already gone through several lineup changes, and furthermore Henri Sattler is the only member who participated on this album who returned for the album's follow-up, 1997's The Grand Grimoire.

Track listing
"Intro:Necrosapiens" - 0:47
"Hordes of Lucifer" - 5:50
"Christ Carnage" - 6:05
"Infernal Sights of a Bloody Dawn (Morbid Rites)" - 8:31
"Necromagnon" - 4:14
"The Christhunt" - 5:37
"Cadavers" - 5:49
"Unholdin of Hewe" - 6:02
"God Dethroned" - 5:52

Recording lineup
Henri Sattler - vocals & guitar
Oscar Carre - guitar
Marco Arends - bass guitar
Ard de Weerd - drums

1992 albums
God Dethroned albums